Lugovoy is a rural locality (a khutor) in Podgorenskoye Urban Settlement, Podgorensky District, Voronezh Oblast, Russia. The population was 438 as of 2010. There are 6 streets.

Geography 
Lugovoy is located 3 km south of Podgorensky (the district's administrative centre) by road. Nikolsky is the nearest rural locality.

References 

Rural localities in Podgorensky District